Trocka may refer to:
 Trocki (feminine: Trocka), a Polish-language toponymic surname
 Trocka metro station, a Warsaw Metro station